Michael David Ricketts (born January 21, 1965 in College Park, Maryland) is an American rock musician, and songwriter. Guitarist for heavy metal rock band ALLOY20. Michael acted as primary recording engineer for their debut CD "ALLOY20 - Part I: Lost in the Veil of Darkness", released on October 20, 2012. Michael spends his spare time producing other acts and is also working on a solo project. He was co-founder and lead guitarist of the rock band Snydly Crunch. Snydly Crunch was featured on the 97-Underground compilation Album in 1987, and released "Revealed" in 1993. The band has performed with artists such as Pat Travers Band, Kix, and Mitch Allan with Honor Among Thieves on several occasions.

With the help of local producer and engineer Ray Tilkins, Snydly Crunch recorded the independent LP Revealed, released on SMARK Records on which Ricketts was co-writer and performed on guitars, keyboards, and backing vocals.

Band members

Alloy20 members
Jeff Grove - lead vocals
Sean Taylor Brown - guitars
Michael Ricketts - guitars
John Taylor - bass guitars
Billy Giddings - drums, percussion

Snydly Crunch members
Michael Spelta - lead vocals, keyboards (1985–1989)
Sean Patrick Mitchell - lead vocals (1991–1994)
Andrew Faile - lead & rhythm guitars (1985–1994)
Michael Ricketts - lead & rhythm guitars, keyboards, vocals (1985–1994)
Steve Toth - drums, percussion (1985–1990)
Karl Seiler - drums, percussion (1990–1994)

Session musicians
Karen Teperberg - drums on Solo Debut (now with Jesse McCartney)

Discography

Alloy20
Part I: Lost in the Veil of Darkness (2012)
Produced by Alloy20, Mixed by Kevin '131' Gutierrez, Mastered by Maor Appelbaum
 Demon of Destruction
 Silent Calls
 Veil of Darkness
 More to Give

Snydly Crunch
Cue Sessions (1986)
Produced and Mixed by Jim Ebert
 Forgotten One
 Strike a Balance
 Vicious Obsession
 The Return
 Say Yes
 Fortitude
97 Underground Compilation (1987)
Produced by Derek Alan for PCA
 Hell's Gates - Artist Wrathchild with Shannon Larkin (now in Godsmack), and Brad Divens
 Then Comes The Night - Artist Snydly Crunch
 Burn The Sky - Artist Mystic Force
 Bad Attitude - Artist Shock Wave
 Nightmares - Artist Mona Lisa
 Found On The Highway Dead - Artist Chapelz
 Hot Seat - Artist Child's Play with John Allen (now in SR-71 (band))
 Scarlet Angel - Artist Scarlet Angel
Revealed (1993)
Produced by Ray Tilkens and Snydly Crunch
 Cry Wolf
 Tomorrows Promise
 Dying To Survive
 The River
 Say Goodbye
 Love In Vain
 Spark Turns Into Flame
 I Feel Love
 Trusting Soul

Stage work
Performed lead guitar for a stage production of The Rocky Horror Picture Show (DC, Summer 2003)

Sources
LiveWire Magazine article - Snydly Crunch

Rox Magazine article - Snydly Crunch p1

Rox Magazine article - Snydly Crunch p2 'look here'

Listing of Snydly Crunch album - Revealed

American rock guitarists
American male guitarists
1965 births
Living people
20th-century American guitarists
20th-century American male musicians